Playback: The Brian Wilson Anthology is a compilation album devoted to the solo career of American musician Brian Wilson, released on September 22, 2017. It covers three decades of music with selections from nine of Wilson's solo albums, released between 1988 and 2015. The album includes two previously unreleased tracks: "Run James Run", an outtake from No Pier Pressure completed for the compilation, and "Some Sweet Day", a song Wilson wrote and recorded with Andy Paley in the early 1990s.

The packaging features a selection of photos from throughout Wilson's solo career, including a candid shot taken in the studio during the recording of "Run James Run".

Track listing

References

2017 compilation albums
Brian Wilson compilation albums